The Consumer Protection Association (CPA) is Myanmar's independent food consumer protection agency.

References

Burmese cuisine
Consumer organisations in Myanmar
Organizations established in 2012
2012 establishments in Myanmar